Johnson High School can refer to:

Canada
F.W. Johnson Collegiate in Regina, Saskatchewan

United States
Johnson High School (Gainesville, Georgia)
Hiram W. Johnson High School
Johnson Senior High School (St. Paul, Minnesota)
Arthur L. Johnson High School (Clark, New Jersey)
Doris M. Johnson High School (Baltimore, Maryland)
Lady Bird Johnson High School (San Antonio, Texas)
Lyndon B. Johnson High School (Austin, Texas)
Lyndon B. Johnson High School (Laredo, Texas)
Governor Thomas Johnson High School (Frederick, Maryland)
Johnson High School (Savannah, Georgia)